Pol Khoda Afarin (also Romanized as Pol Khodā Āfarīn) is a village in Sornabad Rural District, Hamaijan District, Sepidan County, Fars Province, Iran. At the 2006 census, its population was 24, in 7 families.

References 

Populated places in Sepidan County